George Frederick Bullock (22 January 1916 – 31 May 1943) was an English professional footballer who played as a winger in the Football League for Barnsley.

Personal life
Bullock was married and served as a naval airman 1st class in the Fleet Air Arm during the Second World War. Stationed at RNAS Stretton, he was killed in a road accident near Appleton on 31 May 1943 while returning to base following a dance. The vehicle crashed through a hedge and overturned, killing all 6 inside, including Bullock. He was buried at Heath Town (Holy Trinity) Churchyard, Wolverhampton.

Career statistics

References

1916 births
1943 deaths
Military personnel from Staffordshire
Footballers from Wolverhampton
Association football wingers
English footballers
English Football League players
Oakengates Athletic F.C. players
Birmingham City F.C. players
Stafford Rangers F.C. players
Barnsley F.C. players
Fleet Air Arm personnel of World War II
Royal Navy sailors
Royal Navy personnel killed in World War II
Road incident deaths in England